Lophocampa subannula is a moth of the family Erebidae. It was described by William Schaus in 1911. Its known range extends through Costa Rica, Ecuador and Venezuela.

References

 Natural History Museum Lepidoptera generic names catalog

subannula
Moths described in 1911